Bonham House, also known as Flat Grove, is a historic home located near Saluda, Saluda County, South Carolina. It was built about 1780, and is a two-story, log "dogtrot house." The house sits on fieldstone pillars.  It was the boyhood home of Battle of the Alamo soldier James Bonham and his brother politician Milledge Luke Bonham, who served as governor of South Carolina during the American Civil War.

It was added to the National Register of Historic Places in 1974.

The Bonham House is under restoration by the Saluda County Historical Society, which provides tours.

References

External links
 Bonham House – Saluda County Historical Society

Houses on the National Register of Historic Places in South Carolina
Houses completed in 1780
Houses in Saluda County, South Carolina
National Register of Historic Places in Saluda County, South Carolina
Museums in Saluda County, South Carolina
Historic house museums in South Carolina